Valerie Wilson may refer to:

 Valerie Elise Plame Wilson, usually known as Valerie Plame, CIA operative at the center of a criminal investigation and political scandal
 Valerie Rawlston Wilson, African-American economist
 Valerie Wilson Wesley, African-American author; former executive editor of Essence magazine
 Valerie Wilson, from North Babylon, New York, who twice in the 2000s won a $1 million prize in the New York Lottery 

See also:
Valarie Wilson, involved in politics and education